Enjoy Yourself may refer to:
 Enjoy Yourself (Billy Currington album) (2010)
 Enjoy Yourself (Kylie Minogue album) (1989)
 "Enjoy Yourself" (A+ song) (1998)
 "Enjoy Yourself" (The Jacksons song) (1976)
 "Enjoy Yourself (It's Later than You Think)", a 1949 song by Carl Sigman and Herb Magidson